Astrid Melissa Edwarda Horn Weitzberg (born 8 April 1987), known as Melissa Horn, is a Swedish pop artist. She is the daughter of singer Maritza Horn.

Biography
She was born to singer Maritza Horn (born 1951), and Edvard Terrence Weitzberg (born 1955) in an area in Södermalm, near Stockholm.  She has five siblings, all boys. Her parents got her a guitar when she turned 16 and not long afterwards she wrote her first song.  She took vocal courses and then got hold of a producer and eventually got a record contract before she finished high school. In 2010, she started a company called Edward AB.

Career
Melissa Horn's debut album Långa nätter was released on 30 April 2008 followed by Säg ingenting till mig on 14 October 2009. This record eventually went gold, exposing her to a larger audience; she was nominated for Gramiss (Swedish equivalent of the Grammy Awards) in the categories Artist of the Year, Composer of the Year and Lyricist of the Year. A sequel to that album Innan jag kände dig was launched on 16 September 2011 and topped the Swedish Album Charts within its first week of release. She promoted it with a tour in Norway, Denmark and Sweden. Her fourth album Om du vill vara med mig was released on 2 October 2013 and her fifth album entitled Jag går nu came out on 27 November 2015. All her releases are in Swedish.

Horn also sang "Kungsholmens hamn" in a memorial ceremony for the victims of the 2011 Norway attacks in Utøya and Oslo.

After 4 years of hiatus since her last release, Melissa Horn released a new album  Konstgjord andning  on 13 September 2019. She is collaborating with singer Kaah and singer White Collar.

Discography

Studio albums

EPs

Singles

Notes

References

External links

Official website
Intervju med Melissa Horn

1987 births
Living people
Singers from Stockholm
Swedish-language singers
Swedish songwriters
21st-century Swedish singers
21st-century Swedish women singers